Ronde van Overijssel is an elite men's road bicycle racing event held annually in Overijssel, Netherlands and sanctioned by the Royal Dutch Cycling Union.

The event is UCI 1.2 rated, and is part of the UCI Europe Tour. In 2012, the race was expanded to two days for its 60th anniversary, but reverted to a single-day race in 2013. The race has been dominated by home riders; only six of the race's 65 editions have been won by non-Dutch riders: Tayeb Braikia in 1998, Brett Lancaster in 2002, Reinardt Janse van Rensburg in 2010, Dennis Coenen in 2014, Aidis Kruopis in 2016 and Nicolai Brøchner in 2017. Nils Eekhoff won the latest edition in 2018.

Winners

References

External links
  

 
1952 establishments in the Netherlands
Cycling in Overijssel
Cycle races in the Netherlands
Recurring sporting events established in 1952
UCI Europe Tour races